Yi Lianhong (born September 1959) is a Chinese politician, and the current Communist Party Secretary of Zhejiang. Originally from Hunan province, Yi rose through the ranks as an academic at the provincial party school; he later served as party secretary of Yueyang and party secretary of Changsha, before being transferred to Shenyang.

Biography
Yi Lianhong was born in Lianyuan County, Hunan province. He began to work in August 1976 as a rusticated youth performing manual labor in Guihua township. Following the Cultural Revolution, Yi attended Hunan Normal University and graduated in 1982 with a degree in political economics. In July 1982, he became an instructor at the Zhaoyang Basic College. After a few years of teaching, he went on to graduate school at the Shaanxi Normal University to continue studying political economics. He joined the Chinese Communist Party in June 1985. 

After receiving his master's degree in 1987, Yi was assigned to work at the Hunan Party School, where he taught economics. In 1990, he worked for a chemical factory in Zhuzhou as an administrator. In January 1992, he joined the science and technology research office at the Hunan Party School. In September 1994, he became assistant to the president of the party school. In September 1995 he was promoted to vice president of the party school. In July 2000, he was promoted again to executive vice president (prefecture-level, zhengtingji). 

In May 2004, Yi was named party chief of Yueyang, his first foray into a regional leadership role. In November 2011, he was admitted to the Hunan provincial party standing committee, and a month later took on the office of the secretary-general.

In May 2013, Yi was named party chief of Changsha. In July 2017, he was transferred to Shenyang to become party chief there; it was the first cross-provincial transfer of Yi's career. In May 2018 he was named deputy party chief of Liaoning.

After only serving two months as deputy party chief of Liaoning, Yi was named deputy party chief of Jiangxi in August 2018, and he was appointed as the acting Governor in August 2018. On 18 October 2021, he was promoted to Communist Party Secretary of Jiangxi, the top political position in the province. On 20 January 2022, he took office as chairman of Jiangxi People's Congress.

In December 2022, he was appointed Communist Party Secretary of Zhejiang, replacing Yuan Jiajun.

Yi has authored a number of works on economics, agriculture, and his tenure in Yueyang.

References 

1959 births
Governors of Jiangxi
Politicians from Loudi
Living people
Chinese Communist Party politicians from Hunan
People's Republic of China politicians from Hunan
Political office-holders in Hunan
Political office-holders in Liaoning
Hunan Normal University alumni
Shaanxi Normal University alumni
Alternate members of the 19th Central Committee of the Chinese Communist Party
Delegates to the 13th National People's Congress